Torchy Blane is a fictional female reporter, the main character of nine films produced by Warner Bros. between 1937 and 1939. The Torchy Blane series were popular second features during the later 1930s and were mixtures of mystery, action, adventure, and comedy.

Character
During the pre-World War II period, the role of newspaper reporter was one of the few in American cinema that portrayed women as intelligent, competent, self-reliant, and career-oriented—virtually equal to men. Among these screen characters, Torchy Blane, a wisecracking female reporter with an instinct for a scoop, was perhaps the best known. The movies were lighthearted cops-and-robbers films. A typical plot had the daring, fast-talking Torchy unraveling a mystery by staying several steps ahead of her boyfriend, gruff police detective Steve McBride. Torchy's given name is Theresa, used only twice over the course of nine movies, once when boarding an airplane in Fly-Away Baby and again when being given a parking ticket in Blondes at Work.

Production

In 1936, Warner Bros. began to develop an adaptation of the MacBride and Kennedy stories by detective novelist Frederick Nebel. These stories featured a no-nonsense cop named MacBride and his friend known as Kennedy, a hard-drinking newspaperman. For the film version, Kennedy was changed to a woman named "Torchy" Blane and became the love interest of the cop, whose name was now spelled "McBride". Torchy's lifestyle was more compatible with the Hays Code than a faithful on-screen adaptation of Kennedy would have been.

The first film was based on Nebel's MacBride and Kennedy story "No Hard Feelings". (The story was later adapted again as the 1941 film A Shot in the Dark, which was not a Torchy Blane film.) Director Frank MacDonald immediately knew whom he wanted for the role of Torchy Blane. Glenda Farrell had already played hard-boiled reporters in earlier Warner Bros. films, Mystery of the Wax Museum (1933) and Hi, Nellie! (1934), she was quickly cast in the first Torchy Blane movie, Smart Blonde, with Barton MacLane playing detective Steve McBride. Farrell and MacLane would co-star in seven of the nine Torchy Blane films by Warner Bros. Smart Blonde was released on January 2, 1937, the film was a surprise hit, and Warner Bros. made eight more movies from 1937 to 1939.

In the fifth film, Torchy Blane in Panama (1938), Warner Bros. replaced Farrell and MacLane with Lola Lane and Paul Kelly. Negative fan reaction led Warner Bros. to recast Farrell and MacLane in the lead roles. They starred in three more Torchy Blane films. In 1939, Farrell left Warner Bros., and the studio recast the roles with Jane Wyman and Allen Jenkins for the series' final entry, Torchy Blane... Playing with Dynamite (1939). Public reaction was tepid. A leftover Torchy Blane script was adapted into a 1939 film Private Detective, also starring Jane Wyman, but not as the Torchy character.

The only actor to appear in all nine Torchy Blane films was Tom Kennedy as Gahagan, McBride's slow-witted cop sidekick given to bursts of poetry. Various other Warner stock actors were also used repeatedly. Character actor George Guhl made notable appearances in all but the last entry in the series, as forgetful Desk Sergeant Graves, while bit part players Harry Seymour and Jack Wise were in seven. Composer Howard Jackson was credited with scoring all nine films.

Portrayals
In seven of the nine films featuring the character, Torchy Blane was played by Glenda Farrell. In her role as Torchy, Farrell was promoted as being able to speak 400 words in 40 seconds. On her portrayal of the character, Farrell said in her 1969 Time interview: "So before I undertook to do the first Torchy, I determined to create a real human being—and not an exaggerated comedy type. I met those [newswomen] who visited Hollywood and watched them work on visits to New York City. They were generally young, intelligent, refined and attractive. By making Torchy true to life, I tried to create a character practically unique in movies."

Influence
Comic book writer and Superman co-creator Jerry Siegel credited Glenda Farrell's portrayal of Torchy Blane as the inspiration for the DC Comics reporter Lois Lane and the name of actress Lola Lane for Lois' name. Joanne Siegel, the wife of Jerry Siegel and the original model for Lois Lane, also cited Farrell's portrayal of Torchy as Siegel's inspiration for Lois.

Home media
Warner Archive released a boxed set DVD collection featuring all nine Torchy Blane films on March 29, 2010.

Films

References

External links

Torchy Blane at The Thrilling detective

Film characters introduced in 1937
Film series introduced in 1937
Fictional amateur detectives
American film series
Warner Bros. Pictures franchises
Fictional reporters
Female characters in film